Gurdwara Dera Sahib is a gurudwara in Lahore, Pakistan, which commemorates the spot where the 5th guru of Sikhism, Guru Arjan Dev, was martyred in 1606.

Location
The gurdwara is located just outside of the Walled City of Lahore, and is part of an ensemble of monuments which includes the Lahore Fort, Samadhi of Ranjit Singh, Hazuri Bagh quadrangle, Roshnai Gate, and the Badshahi Mosque

History and significance 

The Guru had undergone torture on the orders of the Mughal emperor Jahangir, at a site in Lahore's walled city that is commemorated by the defunct Gurdwara Lal Khoohi - which has been repurposed into a Muslim shrine by the name of Haq Chaar Yaar. The Guru's torture infuriated his close friend and Muslim mystic, Mian Mir. On the fifth day of torture, the Guru's request for a bath in the river was granted after intercession from Mian Mir. After submerging himself in the river, the Guru reportedly did not reappear, and a Mughal search party was unable to retrieve him.

The Guru's son and successor, Guru Hargobind had a memorial built here in 1619. The main Gurudwara building with gilded dome was built during Maharaja Ranjit Singh's reign, while some other additions were made later up until the partition.

Gallery

See also

 Samadhi of Ranjit Singh
 Badshahi Mosque 
 Sikhism

References

Gurdwaras in Pakistan
Religious buildings and structures in Punjab, Pakistan
Religious buildings and structures with domes